Rubén Fuchú (born 27 July 1978) is a Puerto Rican boxer. He competed in the men's welterweight event at the 2000 Summer Olympics.

References

1978 births
Living people
Puerto Rican male boxers
Olympic boxers of Puerto Rico
Boxers at the 2000 Summer Olympics
People from Toa Alta, Puerto Rico
Welterweight boxers